This is a list of mayors of Boise, Idaho.

Boise mayors were originally elected to one-year terms. The terms were extended to two years in 1881 and to four years in 1965.

Lauren McLean, the incumbent, was elected in 2019. The next Boise mayoral election is scheduled for November 2023.

Passages

Notes

References

List
Boise